Irv Gotti Presents: The Remixes is the third compilation album by American record producer Irv Gotti. It was released on November 5, 2002 via Murder Inc. Records and The Island Def Jam Music Group and consists of both original songs and remixes to previously released songs released under the label. The album debuted at number 24 on the Billboard 200 and number 5 on the Top R&B/Hip-Hop Albums in the United States.

Track listing

Charts

References

External links

2002 compilation albums
Hip hop compilation albums
Albums produced by Irv Gotti
Gangsta rap compilation albums
Albums produced by Chink Santana
Def Jam Recordings compilation albums